Muchkapsky District  is an administrative and municipal district (raion), one of the twenty-three in Tambov Oblast, Russia. It is located in the southeast of the oblast. The district borders with Inzhanovsky District in the north, Romanovsky District of Saratov Oblast in the east, Gribanovsky District of Voronezh Oblast in the south, and with Uvarovsky District in the west. Its administrative center is the urban locality (a work settlement) of Muchkapsky. Population: 15,177 (2010 Census);  The population of the administrative center accounts for 46.6% of the district's total population.

Notable residents 

Tamara Frolova (born 1959), politician

References

Notes

Sources

Districts of Tambov Oblast